Mphokuhle Dube (born 22 March 1997) is a Zimbabwean cricketer. He made his first-class debut for Matabeleland Tuskers in the 2017–18 Logan Cup on 12 November 2017.

References

External links
 

1997 births
Living people
Zimbabwean cricketers
Place of birth missing (living people)
Matabeleland Tuskers cricketers